Iron Ore was a weekly newspaper published in Ishpeming, Michigan starting in 1886. Formed from the merger of two smaller papers, it lasted until 1951 when it merged with another local paper, the Reflector.

References 
About Iron Ore. (Ishpeming, Mich.) 1886-1951

Newspapers established in 1874
Defunct newspapers published in Michigan
Weekly newspapers published in the United States
Publications disestablished in 1951
1874 establishments in Michigan
1951 disestablishments in Michigan